The Saint George and the Dragon sculpture is located in Köpmantorget (Merchants' Street) in Gamla stan, Stockholm, Sweden. Unveiled on 10 October 1912, marking the anniversary of the Battle of Brunkeberg, it is a bronze replica of Bernt Notke's wooden Saint George and the Dragon, which is in Stockholm's Storkyrkan. It is dedicated to Saint George, in particular the legend of Saint George and the Dragon.

The sculpture was moulded by Otto Meyer. It depicts the knight, sword raised, about to deliver the final blow to the dragon, which is lying prone on its back having been lanced.

References

External links

Saint George and the Dragon
1912 sculptures
1912 establishments in Sweden
1912 works
Outdoor sculptures in Stockholm
Sculptures in Sweden
Bronze sculptures
Horses in art
Sculptures of dragons